Gunjan is an Indian feminine given name. Notable people with the name include:
Gunjan Saxena
Gunjan Sinha
Gunjan Bagla
Gunjan Malhotra, Indian actress
Gunjan Walia, Indian actress and model
Gunjan Bhardwaj, Indian actor
Gunjan Vijaya (born 1985), Indian actress